Ping is an unincorporated community in Garfield County, in the U.S. state of Washington.

History
A post office called Ping was established in 1889, and remained in operation until 1910. The community has the name of Frank and Robert Ping, pioneer settlers.

References

Unincorporated communities in Garfield County, Washington
Unincorporated communities in Washington (state)